Rómulo Pizarro Tomasio (born August 20, 1955 in Arequipa) is a former Peruvian Interior Minister.

References

Peruvian Ministers of Interior
Living people
1955 births
People from Arequipa
21st-century Peruvian politicians